The 1999–2000 Allsvenskan season was the first season of the Allsvenskan, the second level of ice hockey in Sweden. 24 teams participated in the league, and Timrå IK, Södertälje SK, IF Björklöven, and Nyköpings Hockey 90 qualified for the Kvalserien.

Regular season

Northern Group

Southern Group

Superallsvenskan 
The top two teams qualify for the Kvalserien qualification for Elitserien, and teams 3–6 qualify for the playoffs towards the Kvalserien qualification.

Playoffs 
First round
 Hammarby IF - Mora IK 0:2 (2:3 OT, 1:3)
 Tingsryds AIF - Nyköpings Hockey 90 1:2 (5:1, 1:5, 6:2)
 Skellefteå AIK - Rögle BK 2:1 (4:3 OT, 1:5, 2:3 OT)
 IK Oskarshamn - IF Björklöven 0:2 (2:4, 3:8)

Second round
 Skellefteå AIK - IF Björklöven 0:2 (1:5, 4:5)
 Mora IK - Nyköpings Hockey 90 1:2 (5:1, 2:4, 0:1)

Relegation round 
The top two teams in each group qualify for the playoffs towards the Kvalserien qualification for Elitserien, and the two worst teams in each group are relegated to Division 1.

Northern Group

Southern Group

Kvalserien

External links 
 Season on passionhockey.com

Swe
HockeyAllsvenskan seasons
2